The Salem Register (1800-ca.1911) was a newspaper published in Salem, Massachusetts, in the 19th century. William Carlton established it in 1800; subsequent publishers included his wife Elizabeth Carlton, John Chapman, Charles W. Palfray, Warick Palfray Jr., Haven Poole, Eben N. Walton. Among the contributing writers: William Bentley, Andrew Dunlap, Joseph E. Sprague, Joseph Story. Its office was at no.185 Essex Street.

In the 1800s the Register "began its career as an advocate for the election of Mr. Jefferson to the Presidency. With all the ability of its editor and his friends -- among whom were the Rev. William Bentley and some of the wealthiest families in Salem -- it opposed the doctrines and the measures of the federal party. The political warfare between the Register and the Salem Gazette was carried on with great vigor and bitterness."

From 1807 to 1840 the paper was called the Essex Register, then again called the Salem Register. "The reason for altering the title from Essex to Salem was that letters and packages directed to their office were carried to the town of Essex and thus caused considerable inconvenience." In the 1820s-1830s, "prior to the amalgamation of distinct parties in politics under the names of Whig and Democrat the Register sustained those who called themselves Republicans."

Variant titles
 The Impartial Register, 1800-1800
 Salem Impartial Register, 1800-1801
 Salem Register, 1802-1807, 1841-1903, 1906-ca.1911
 Essex Register, 1807-1840
 Salem Register and Essex County Mercury, 1903-1906

References

Further reading
 

Defunct newspapers published in Massachusetts
Publications established in 1800
History of Salem, Massachusetts
Mass media in Essex County, Massachusetts
1910s disestablishments in the United States
1800 establishments in Massachusetts